Corbin Franklin Carroll (born August 21, 2000) is an American professional baseball outfielder for the Arizona Diamondbacks of Major League Baseball (MLB). Carroll was selected by the Diamondbacks in the first round of the 2019 MLB draft and he made his MLB debut in 2022.

Early life
Carroll was born in Seattle, Washington as was his father. Carroll's mother was born in Taiwan, and moved to Louisiana at the age of 6.

Amateur career
Carroll played on the USA 18U National Team that won Gold in the 2018 COPABE Pan-American Championships. Carroll attended Lakeside School in Seattle, Washington. As a senior in 2019, he hit .540 with nine home runs and a 1.859 OPS. He committed to play college baseball at UCLA.

Professional career
The Arizona Diamondbacks selected Carroll in the first round of the 2019 Major League Baseball draft. He signed for $3.7 million and was assigned to the Arizona League Diamondbacks to make his professional debut. After batting .291 with two home runs, 14 RBIs, and 16 stolen bases over 31 games, he was promoted to the Hillsboro Hops on August 8. Over 11 games with Hillsboro, he batted .326 with six RBIs. Between the two teams, he batted .299/.409/.487 in 154 at bats, with 18 stolen bases in 19 attempts.

Carroll did not play a minor league game in 2020 due to the cancellation of the minor league season caused by the COVID-19 pandemic. Carroll returned to Hillsboro to begin the 2021 season. However, in early May, Carroll injured his shoulder while hitting a home run and later underwent season-ending shoulder surgery. At the time, he was 10-for-23 for the season.

Carroll opened the 2022 season with the Amarillo Sod Poodles. In early July, he was promoted to the Reno Aces. With three minor league teams in 2022 he batted .307/.425/.611 in 362 at bats with 24 home runs and 31 steals in 36 attempts.

The Diamondbacks promoted Carroll to the major leagues on August 29, 2022. He made his debut later that day, against the Philadelphia Phillies. He went 1–for-5 with a two-RBI double. In 2022 with Arizona, he batted .260/.330/.500 in 104 at bats, playing primarily left field, and was the 7th-youngest ballplayer in the NL. He had the fastest sprint speed of any major league player, at 30.7 feet/second.

On March 11, 2023, Carroll signed a contract extension worth $111 million over eight years with the Diamondbacks.

References

External links

2000 births
Living people
Amarillo Sod Poodles players
Arizona Complex League Diamondbacks players
Arizona Diamondbacks players
Arizona League Diamondbacks players
Baseball players from Seattle
Hillsboro Hops players
Major League Baseball outfielders
Reno Aces players
American sportspeople of Taiwanese descent